In poker, players form sets of five playing cards, called hands, according to the rules of the game. Each hand has a rank, which is compared against the ranks of other hands participating in the showdown to decide who wins the pot. In high games, like Texas hold 'em and seven-card stud, the highest-ranking hands win. In low games, like razz, the lowest-ranking hands win. In high-low split games, both the highest-ranking and lowest-ranking hands win, though different rules are used to rank the high and low hands.

Each hand belongs to a category determined by the patterns formed by its cards. A hand in a higher-ranking category always ranks higher than a hand in a lower-ranking category. A hand is ranked within its category using the ranks of its cards. Individual cards are ranked, from highest to lowest: A, K, Q, J, 10, 9, 8, 7, 6, 5, 4, 3 and 2. However, aces have the lowest rank under ace-to-five low or ace-to-six low rules, or under high rules as part of a five-high straight or straight flush. Suits are not ranked, so hands that differ by suit alone are of equal rank.

There are nine categories of hand when using a standard 52-card deck, except under ace-to-five low rules where straights, flushes and straight flushes are not recognized. An additional category, five of a kind, exists when using one or more wild cards. The fewer hands a category contains, the higher its rank. There are  ways to deal five cards from the deck but only  distinct hands, because the order in which cards are dealt or arranged in a hand does not matter. Moreover, since hands differing only by suit are of equal rank, there are only 7,462 distinct hand ranks.

Hand-ranking categories

Five of a kind

It ranks above a straight flush but is only possible when using one or more wild cards, as there are only four cards of each rank in the deck. Five of a kind, aces, becomes possible when a joker is added to the deck as a bug, a form of wild card that may act as a fifth ace. Other wild card rules allow jokers or other designated cards to represent any card in the deck, making it possible to form five of a kind of any rank.

Each five of a kind is ranked by the rank of its quintuplet.

Straight flush

It ranks below five of a kind and above four of a kind. Under deuce-to-seven low rules, an ace always ranks high (so  is an ace-high flush). Under ace-to-six low rules, an ace always rank low (so  is a king-high flush). Under ace-to-five low rules, straight flushes are not possible (so  is a nine-high hand).

Each straight flush is ranked by the rank of its highest-ranking card.

Four of a kind

It ranks below a straight flush and above a full house.

Each four of a kind is ranked first by the rank of its quadruplet, and then by the rank of its kicker.

Full house

It ranks below four of a kind and above a flush.

Each full house is ranked first by the rank of its triplet, and then by the rank of its pair.

Flush

It ranks below a full house and above a straight. Under ace-to-five low rules, flushes are not possible (so  is a jack-high hand).

Each flush is ranked first by the rank of its highest-ranking card, then by the rank of its second highest-ranking card, then by the rank of its third highest-ranking card, then by the rank of its fourth highest-ranking card, and finally by the rank of its lowest-ranking card.

Straight

It ranks below a flush and above three of a kind. Under deuce-to-seven low rules, an ace always ranks high (so  is an ace-high hand). Under ace-to-six low rules, an ace always ranks low (so  is a king-high hand). Under ace-to-five low rules, straights are not possible (so  is a ten-high hand).

Each straight is ranked by the rank of its highest-ranking card.

Three of a kind

It ranks below a straight and above two pair.

Each three of a kind is ranked first by the rank of its triplet, then by the rank of its highest-ranking kicker, and finally by the rank of its lowest-ranking kicker.

In community card games, such as Texas hold 'em, three of a kind is called a set only when it comprises a pocket pair and a third card on the board.

Two pair

It ranks below three of a kind and above one pair.

Each two pair is ranked first by the rank of its higher-ranking pair, then by the rank of its lower-ranking pair, and finally by the rank of its kicker.

One pair

It ranks below two pair and above high card.

Each one pair is ranked first by the rank of its pair, then by the rank of its highest-ranking kicker, then by the rank of its second highest-ranking kicker, and finally by the rank of its lowest-ranking kicker.

High card

Note that under ace-to-five low rules, straights, flushes and straight flushes are not possible, so such hands are instead high card hands. It ranks below one pair.

Each high card hand is ranked first by the rank of its highest-ranking card, then by the rank of its second highest-ranking card, then by the rank of its third highest-ranking card, then by the rank of its fourth highest-ranking card, and finally by the rank of its lowest-ranking card.

See also

 Glossary of poker terms
 List of playing-card nicknames
 Non-standard poker hand
 Poker probability

References

External links 
 

 
Gaming-related lists